Ponikiew  (German: Neues Vorwerk) is a village in the administrative district of Gmina Tuczno, within Wałcz County, West Pomeranian Voivodeship, in north-western Poland.

The village has a population of 70.

Before 1945 the village was German-settled and part of the German state of Prussia.

References

Ponikiew